A partial solar eclipse will occur on Thursday, August 21, 2036. A solar eclipse occurs when the Moon passes between Earth and the Sun, thereby totally or partly obscuring the image of the Sun for a viewer on Earth. A partial solar eclipse occurs in the polar regions of the Earth when the center of the Moon's shadow misses the Earth.

Images 
Animated path

Related eclipses

Solar eclipses of 2033–2036

Saros 155 series

Metonic series

References

External links 
 NASA graphics

2036 8 21
2036 in science
2036 8 21
2036 8 21